Acorns may refer to:

 Plural of acorn, the nut of the oak tree
 Acorns (company), a micro-investing and robo-advisor financial company
 Acorns (suit), one of the four suits in German pattern playing cards
 Acorns Children's Hospice, a charity in England
 Springfield Acorns, a minor league American football team in Springfield, Massachusetts

See also 
 Acorn (disambiguation)
 Little Acorns (disambiguation)